Cowan or Cowans may refer to:

Places

Australia
 Cowan, New South Wales
 Cowan Creek, a waterway to the north of Sydney, Australia
 Division of Cowan, a federal division of the Australian House of Representatives, in Western Australia
 Hundred of Cowan, a cadastral division in South Australia

Canada
 Cowan, Manitoba

United States
 Cowan, California
 Cowan, Indiana
 Cowan, Pennsylvania
 Cowan, Tennessee
 Cowans Brook, a stream in Minnesota

Other uses 
 Cowan (surname), a surname
 EML Admiral Cowan (M313), a Sandown-class minehunter of the Estonian Navy

See also 
 
 Cowen (disambiguation)
 Parkinson Cowan, a brand of cooking appliances
 Rich & Cowan, UK book publishing company